Natural uranium (NU or Unat) refers to uranium with the same isotopic ratio as found in nature. It contains 0.711% uranium-235, 99.284% uranium-238, and a trace of uranium-234 by weight (0.0055%). Approximately 2.2% of its radioactivity  comes from uranium-235, 48.6% from uranium-238, and 49.2% from uranium-234.

Natural uranium can be used to fuel both low- and high-power nuclear reactors. Historically, graphite-moderated reactors and  heavy water-moderated reactors have been fueled with natural uranium in the pure metal (U) or uranium dioxide (UO2) ceramic forms. However, experimental fuelings with uranium trioxide (UO3) and triuranium octaoxide (U3O8) have shown promise.

The 0.72% uranium-235 is not sufficient to produce a self-sustaining critical chain reaction in light water reactors or nuclear weapons; these applications must use enriched uranium. Nuclear weapons take a concentration of 90% uranium-235, and light water reactors require a concentration of roughly 3% uranium-235. Unenriched natural uranium is appropriate fuel for a heavy-water reactor, like a CANDU reactor.

On rare occasions, earlier in geologic history when uranium-235 was more abundant, uranium ore was found to have naturally engaged in fission, forming natural nuclear fission reactors. Uranium-235 decays at a faster rate (half-life of 700 million years) compared to uranium-238, which decays extremely slowly (half-life of 4.5 billion years). Therefore, a billion years ago, there was more than double the uranium-235 compared to now.

During the Manhattan Project, the name Tuballoy was used to refer to natural uranium in the refined condition; this term is still in occasional use. Uranium was also codenamed "X-Metal" during World War II. Similarly, enriched uranium was referred to as Oralloy (Oak Ridge alloy), and depleted uranium was referred to as Depletalloy (depleted alloy).

See also
List of uranium mines
Nuclear engineering
Nuclear fuel cycle
Nuclear physics
Nuclear chemistry

References
Design Parameters for a Natural Uranium Fueled Nuclear Reactor, C. M. Hopper et al., ORNL/TM-2002/240, November 2002.

External links
The evolution of CANDU fuel cycles

Uranium
Nuclear fuels
Nuclear materials